The 2006 Korea National League was the fourth season of the Korea National League. It was divided into two stages, and the winners of each stage qualified for the championship playoff.

Regular season

First stage

Second stage

Championship playoff

Summary

Results

Goyang Kookmin Bank won 2–0 on aggregate.

Awards

Main awards

Source:

Best XI

Source:

See also
 2006 in South Korean football
 2006 Korea National League Championship
 2006 Korean FA Cup

References

External links

Korea National League seasons
K